Thomas Auracher (born 14 December 1969) is a German former yacht racer who competed in the 2000 Summer Olympics.

References

External links
 
 
 

1969 births
Living people
Soling class sailors
German male sailors (sport)
Olympic sailors of Germany
Sailors at the 2000 Summer Olympics – Star
5.5 Metre class sailors
World Champions in 5.5 Metre
World champions in sailing for Germany